Jiang Shan (born September 1962) is a former Chinese politician who spent most of his career in east China's Anhui province. As of April 2014 he was under investigation by the Communist Party's anti-corruption agency, and he was expelled from the party and removed from office in December 2014. Previously he served as the Communist Party Secretary of Chuzhou.

Life and career
Jiang was born and raised in She County, Anhui. After college, he worked at Longfu Middle School. And later an official at the Propaganda Department of CPC Tunxi Municipal Committee.

Beginning in December 1987, he served in several posts in Huizhou District, including secretary, deputy director, and director.

He was promoted to Vice-Mayor of Huangshan in November 2000. In June 2003 he was promoted again to become the Deputy Communist Party Secretary.

In September 2005, he was transferred to Hefei, capital of Anhui province, and served as the head and Party Branch Secretary of Travel Bureau of Anhui province.

He served as Mayor and Deputy Communist Party Secretary of Chuzhou from January 2010 to February 2012, and Communist Party Secretary, the top political position in the city, from February 2012 to April 2014. At the same time as holding the post of Director of the Chuzhou Municipal People's Congress between July 2012 to January 2013.

In April 2014, he was being investigated by the Party's internal disciplinary body for "serious violations of laws and regulations". On December 30, 2014, he was expelled from the party and removed from office. 

In October 2017 he was sentenced to 11 years in prison on taking bribes. He was fined 1.4 million yuan and had his illegal gains confiscated.

References

1962 births
Chinese Communist Party politicians from Anhui
Living people
Political office-holders in Anhui
People's Republic of China politicians from Anhui
Politicians from Huangshan